Edwin Harrison McHenry (January 25, 1859 – August 21, 1931) was the fourth vice-president of the New York, New Haven and Hartford Railroad and first vice-president of the Consolidated Railway of  Hartford, Connecticut. Prior to joining the New Haven, McHenry had been chief engineer and a receiver of the Northern Pacific Railway and later the chief engineer of the Canadian Pacific Railway.

Biography
He was born in Cincinnati, Ohio on January 25, 1859. He attended the Pennsylvania Military College at Chester, Pennsylvania.

He first started working on the railroad in 1883 as a rodman doing surveying on the Black Hills branch of the Northern Pacific Railroad. He progressed from rodman to chainman, draftsman, leveler, transitman, assistant engineer, division engineer, principal assistant engineer, and from November 1, 1893 to January 1, 1896, he was the chief engineer.

Starting on October 1, 1904 he was the first vice-president of the Consolidated Railway. He was also in charge of construction, operation and maintenance of the trolley lines owned by the New York, New Haven and Hartford Railroad. He was the fourth vice-president, New York, New Haven and Hartford Railroad, in charge of the electrical department.

While working for the Northern Pacific, McHenry performed two notable engineering feats, and made one memorable marketing suggestion:

 In the 1880s McHenry was the principal assistant engineer on Stampede Pass during the construction of Stampede Tunnel, linking western Washington and especially the Puget Sound ports of Seattle and Tacoma to the East by rail.
 In the early 1890s McHenry was tasked with locating a line from the vicinity of Logan westward to Butte, Montana. During the course of this work McHenry discovered Homestake Pass, the pass which Interstate 90 now crosses the Continental Divide in Montana.
 In 1893, McHenry was in Chicago visiting the Columbian Exposition. While there, he visited the Korean display and noticed the prominent ying-yang symbol (or Monad) in the Korean flag. He suggested the suitability of this symbol to the Northern Pacific General Passenger Agent Charles S. Fee and circa 1896 the symbol was adopted as the logotype of the newly reorganized Northern Pacific Railway.

McHenry died on August 21, 1931 in Ardmore, Pennsylvania.

Legacy
McHenry, North Dakota was named by the Northern Pacific for him. Frances, Washington was named by McHenry for his wife, whose middle name was Frances.

Engineering
 In the 1880s on the Northern Pacific, McHenry was the principal assistant engineer on Stampede Pass during the construction of Stampede Tunnel, linking western Washington and especially the Puget Sound ports of Seattle and Tacoma to the East by rail.
 In the early 1890s McHenry was tasked with locating a line from the vicinity of Logan westward to Butte, Montana. During the course of this work McHenry discovered Homestake Pass, the pass which Interstate 90 now crosses the Continental Divide in Montana.

References

Publications and papers
 McHenry, Edwin H. Rules for Railway Location and Construction Used on the Northern Pacific Railway [with a chapter on] Estimating Overhaul in Earthwork. New York: Engineering News Publishing, 1901.
 McHenry's papers as chief engineer of the Northern Pacific are held by the Minnesota Historical Society in St. Paul, Minnesota. Some additional papers and correspondence are held by the University of Montana's K. Ross Toole Archives in Missoula, Montana.

Further reading
 Biographical Directory of the Railway Officials of America, 1906 edition, pp. 381–82.
 Dakota Dateboook, May 26, 2006, "Moving Date." The story of McHenry and the Northern Pacific moving a massive bridge pier for the railway's crossing of the Missouri River at Bismarck, North Dakota. Available on the Web at: www.prairiepublic.org/programs/datebook/bydate/06/0506/052906.jsp.
 Frances, Washington, history, available on the Web at: visit.willapabay.org/pages/communities/frances.html.
 Krapp, Connie Allen. "The Loop That Has No End." North Dakota Horizons, Spring, 2000. Available on the Web at: www.ndhorizons.com/default.cfm?page=arc_spring00.

Northern Pacific Railway people
New York, New Haven and Hartford Railroad
Widener University alumni
1859 births
1931 deaths
American civil engineers
Explorers of Montana